This article is about the demographic features of the population of Yemen, including population density, ethnicity, education level, health of the populace, economic status, religious affiliations and other aspects of the population.

Population

The population of Yemen was about  million according to  estimates, with 46% of the population being under 15 years old and 2.7% above 65 years. In 1950, it was 4.3 million. By 2050, the population is estimated to increase to about 60 million.

Yemenis are mainly of Arab ethnicity. When the former states of North and South Yemen were established, most resident minority groups departed. Yemen is still a largely tribal society. In the northern, mountainous parts of the country, there are some 400 Zaidi tribes. There are also hereditary caste groups in urban areas such as Al-Akhdam.

According to the USCRI, Yemen hosted a population of refugees and asylum seekers numbering approximately 69 in 2017. Refugees and asylum seekers living in Yemen were predominantly from  Iraq, Somalia, Ethiopia, and Syria.

Ethnic groups
Predominantly Arab; but also a minority of Horn Africans, South Asians, and Europeans. Formerly home to a Jewish diaspora community but now has 0 Jews

Languages
Arabic is the official language; English is also used in official and business circles. In the Mahra area (the extreme east), several non-Arabic languages (including Mehri) are spoken. When the former states of North and South Yemen were established, most resident minority groups departed.

Religions

Religion in Yemen consists primarily of two principal Islamic religious groups: 65% of the Muslim population is Sunni and 34.5% is Shia. Others put the numbers of Shias at 30%. Sunnis primarily adhere to the Shafi'i school, and there are also significant followers of the Maliki and Hanbali schools. Shias are primarily Zaidi and also have significant minorities of Twelver and Ismaili Shias.

Zaidis are generally found in the north and northwest and Shafi'is in the south and southeast. There are also approximately 3,000 Christians There was formerly a large Jewish population but as of 2021 there are 0 Jews living in Yemen.

Literacy

According to composite data compiled by the World Bank, the adult literacy rate for Yemen in 2005 was 35 percent for females and 73 percent for males. The overall literacy rate for the population age 15 and older was 54 percent. By comparison, low-income countries in the aggregate average an adult literacy rate of almost 62 percent.

In 2006 only 75 percent of Yemen's school-age population was enrolled in primary school; enrollment was even lower for the female population—only 65 percent. In that same year, only 37 percent of the school-age population was enrolled in secondary school, including only 26 percent of eligible females.

Diaspora

The Yemeni diaspora is largely concentrated in the United Kingdom, where between 70,000 and 80,000 Yemenis live. Over 20,000 Yemenis reside in the United States, and an additional 2,812 live in Italy. Other Yemenis also reside in Saudi Arabia, the United Arab Emirates, Qatar and Bahrain, as well as Indonesia, Malaysia, Brunei, and the former USSR. A smaller number of modern-day Pakistanis are of Yemeni descent, their original ancestors having left Yemen for the Indian subcontinent and Southeast Asia over four centuries ago. 350,000 Yemenite Jews live in Israel. In 2015, due to the conflict in Yemen, many have migrated to the northern coasts of Djibouti and Somalia.

Demographic statistics from the CIA World Factbook

The following demographic statistics are from the CIA World Factbook, unless otherwise indicated.

Population

Source: CIA Factbooks 2000–2010.

Age structure

estimates for 2010:
 0–14 years: 43.5% (male 5,199,954/female 5,013,165)
 15–64 years: 53.9% (male 6,438,569/female 6,233,708)
 65 years and over: 2.6% (male 291,319/female 318,646)

Population growth rate
 3.213% (2010 est.)

Sex ratio
(2010 est.)
 at birth: 1.05 male(s)/female
 under 15 years: 1.04 male(s)/female
 15–64 years: 1.03 male(s)/female
 65 years and over: 0.91 male(s)/female
 total population: 1.03 male(s)/female

Urbanization

 Urban population: 31% of total population (2008)
 Rate of urbanization: 4.9% annual rate of change (2005–2010 est.)

AIDS adult prevalence rate
  0.1% (2001 est.)

HIV/AIDS – people living with HIV/AIDS
 12,000 (2001 est.)

HIV/AIDS – deaths
N/A

Life expectancy at birth
(2010 est.)
 total population: 63.36 years
 male: 61.35 years
 female: 65.47 years

Major infectious diseases
 degree of risk: high
 food or waterborne diseases: bacterial diarrhea, hepatitis A, and typhoid fever
 vectorborne diseases: dengue fever and malaria
 water contact disease: schistosomiasis (2009)

Nationality
 noun: Yemeni(s)
 adjective: Yemeni

Vital statistics
In 2007 the birthrate and death rate were estimated to be 42.7 per 1,000 and 8.1 per 1,000, respectively (CIA est.). The infant mortality rate was almost 58 deaths per 1,000 live births. The rate was estimated to be higher for males than for females—more than 62 male deaths per 1,000 live births, as compared with about 53 female deaths per 1,000 live births. Despite an increase of 14 years in the last decade, life expectancy at birth in Yemen has remained low compared with other developing countries—60.6 years for males and 64.5 years for females, or 62.5 years overall. The country's fertility rate was almost 6.5 children per woman in 2007 free.

UN estimates

Fertility and births
Total Fertility Rate (TFR) (Wanted Fertility Rate) and Crude Birth Rate (CBR):

Population Estimates by Sex and Age Group (01.VII.2013): 

Population Estimates by Sex and Age Group (01.VII.2017):

Life expectancy 

Source: UN World Population Prospects

See also 
 Demographics of the Middle East
 Tribes in Yemen

References

 
Demographics of Asia by country